The Saint Sava Serbian Orthodox Church is a Serbian Orthodox church in Jackson, California. Built in 1894, the church was the first Serbian Orthodox church in America. Amador County had a large Serbian-American population in the late 1800s due to the California Gold Rush, and the county's Serbs established the St. Sava Church Organization of Amador County in 1886–87; the organization was responsible for purchasing land for and building the church, and the effort was led by Sevastijan Dabović. The church's original design had an Eastern Orthodox influence, complete with an onion dome; while the dome was later replaced by a bell tower, the church's stained glass windows and use of icons still give it a distinctive Eastern Orthodox character. The church has been used for Serbian-American religious and social activities since its opening and is now part of the Serbian Orthodox Eparchy of Western America.

Next to the church there is the Saint Sava Cemetery where early California Gold Rush prospectors and parishioners and their descendants are buried.

In 1922 there was a mining disaster that took place that impacted the town as a whole, but especially Italian and Serbian communities in Jackson. There is a monument to eleven Argonaut Miners buried at Saint Sava's of Jackson. The mass burial was held on September 22, 1922, for 47 migrant miners, among them 17 were from Italy, eleven were from  Serbian lands in the Balkans, and the others were from other European countries, namely Spain, Sardinia, Austria, Germany, Portugal, Sweden and Switzerland. Two decades later, another disaster occurred in Montana at the Smith Mine where 74 miners perished, among them several Serbs.

The church was added to the National Register of Historic Places on March 6, 1986.

See also
 Smith Mine disaster
 Monongah mining disaster
 Argonaut Mine
 Coal mining disasters in United States
 Treadwell Gold Mine

References

Sources

External links

Eastern Orthodox churches in California
Serbian Orthodox church buildings in the United States
Churches in Amador County, California
19th-century Serbian Orthodox church buildings
Churches on the National Register of Historic Places in California
Churches completed in 1894
Historic American Buildings Survey in California
Serbian-American history
National Register of Historic Places in Amador County, California
1894 establishments in California